Mercy College is an all-girls Catholic voluntary Secondary School in Sligo with a co-educational Aonad under the trusteeship of CEIST.

History
The school traces its origins to 1846 when members of the order of Sisters of Mercy came to Sligo. In 1849, they established Scoil Phadraig Naofa which grew rapidly in numbers. Out of this school grew the Mercy College. Over the years new buildings and sports facilities have been added.

Irish language
The Aonad Loch Gile is an all-Irish stream within the college. This stream is for girls and boys.

References

Girls' schools in the Republic of Ireland
Secondary schools in County Sligo
Sligo (town)
Educational institutions established in 1846
1846 establishments in Ireland
Sisters of Mercy schools